Silvanus lewisi, sometimes known as Asian silvanid beetle, is a species of silvan flat bark beetle found throughout Oriental region and introduced to many parts of the world.

Distribution
Found throughout Afro-Oriental tropics, including Congo, Ghana, India, Sri Lanka, China, Vietnam, Taiwan, Japan, Malaysia, Singapore, Java, and Borneo. It also found in Oceanian islands such as Solomon Islands, the Philippines, and Australia. Meanwhile, it has introduced to Western world and can be found in Britain, and USA.

Description
Average length is about 2.07-2.50 mm. Body dull yellow-brown in color and covered with short, semi-erect, golden pubescence. Head broader and narrower across eyes. Puncturation coarse and dense. Eyes extremely large and prominent, but temples are very small. Antennae comprised with segments 1-6 slightly more elongate. Prothorax convex, and elongated. Scutellum large, transverse and pubescent. Pronotum with sides less sinuate and puncturation dense. Elytra broad, with setal punctures which are slightly tuberculate on disc.

Biology
The adults are observed from various stored food products and dunnage. At light, they hide under bark of tree stumps. Adults are found from desiccated coconut from Sri Lanka and found on tapioca flour from Thailand as well as on rice and pulses from Myanmar. In African records, they have found from the residues of bark and gum arabic, freshly fallen coconut palms in Ghana, Nigerian groundnut kernels and red beans from Mombasa.

Recorded plant species include: Shorea robusta, Bombax, Sterculia campanulata, Terminalia bialata, Cocos nucifera.

References 

Silvanidae
Insects of Sri Lanka
Insects of India
Insects described in 1876